The Minister of Foreign Affairs, International Cooperation and Gambians Abroad, commonly known as just the Minister of Foreign Affairs, is a cabinet position in the Gambia, appointed by the President of the Gambia. The minister oversees the Ministry of Foreign Affairs as well as the Gambia's external relations with foreign countries. The Minister is responsible for all Gambian embassies and diplomatic missions overseas and is assisted in this task by civil servants, including a Permanent Secretary, a Deputy Permanent Secretary for Administration and Finance, a Deputy Permanent Secretary for Technical, and a Principal Assistant Secretary.

Ministers of Foreign Affairs, 1965–present

Source:

References

Foreign
Politicians
Foreign ministers of the Gambia